"Afterglow" is a song by English singer Ed Sheeran. Released on 21 December 2020, the song marked Sheeran's first single release in more than 18 months. An accompanying music video features a one-take performance by Sheeran with solo acoustic guitar accompaniment.

The song reached number-one in Israel and peaked within the top-ten of the charts in ten other countries, including the United Kingdom (number two on the UK Singles Chart), Australia and Switzerland. It also became Sheeran's 13th top ten on the US Billboard Adult Top 40, the most on the chart for a male solo artist.

Background
On 20 December 2020, after having taken an extended hiatus from public life, Sheeran returned to social media to announce his new single: "Hey guys. 'Afterglow' is a song I wrote last year that I wanted to release for you". He further explained that the song is "not the first single from the next album" but just a song he loves.

Cover art
The cover art depicts an original piece of action painting created by Sheeran himself.

Critical reception
The song received generally positive reviews from critics. Billboards Gil Kaufmann described the song as a "spare acoustic ballad" that features a "haunting chorus". Zoe Haylock of Vulture compared the song to Taylor Swift's latest surprise releases, saying he "took a page out of Taylor Swift's book and surprised fans with a new single" and went on to describe the track as one of his "acoustic bangers". Morgan Hines of USA Today thought the song, accompanied by a "mellow melody", "exudes a feeling of intimacy during an emotional time between loved ones".

Personnel
Credits adapted from Tidal.

 Ed Sheeran – producer, guitar, vocals, backing vocals
 Fred – producer, bass, programmer
 Marco Parisi – synthesiser
 Giampaolo Jack Parisi – vocoder
 Stuart Hawkes – masterer
 Mark Spike Stent – mixer 
 Matt Wolach – assistant mixer
 Parisi – producer, sound designer

Charts

Weekly charts

Year-end charts

Certifications

Release history

References

2020 singles
2021 singles
2020 songs
Ed Sheeran songs
Asylum Records singles
Folk ballads
Number-one singles in Israel
Song recordings produced by Ed Sheeran
Songs written by David Hodges
Songs written by Ed Sheeran
Songs written by Fred Again